The ITF Jounieh Open (also known as the Jounieh Challenger) is a tournament for female professional tennis players played on outdoor clay courts. The event is classified as an ITF $100,000 tournament. It is held annually in Jounieh, Lebanon, since 2003. The event was cancelled in 2006 and from 2011 due to sponsorship reasons.

Past finals

Singles

Doubles

References
http://www.itftennis.com/procircuit/tournaments/women's-calendar.aspx?tour=&reg=&nat=LIB&sur=&cate=AL&iod=&fromDate=01-04-1950&toDate=30-04-2012

 
ITF Women's World Tennis Tour
Clay court tennis tournaments
Tennis in Lebanon
Recurring sporting events established in 2003